Star Showbiz is a weekly tabloid from the Daily Star in Bangladesh. Focusing on local and international media, the tabloid is published every Saturday. With the slogan "Your Weekly Dose of Entertainment", Star Showbiz maintains a clear goal to promote Bangladeshi media to the elite society of the country.

External links
 http://www.thedailystar.net/showbiz

English-language newspapers published in Bangladesh
Weekly newspapers published in Bangladesh